Preminche Manasu is a 1999 Indian Telugu-language romantic psychological thriller film starring Vadde Naveen and Keerthi Reddy. The film is a remake of the 1998 Tamil-language film Priyamudan. It was not commercially successful.

Cast

Soundtrack 
The songs are composed by S. A. Rajkumar. The lyrics were written by Seetharama Sastry and Chandrabose.

Release 
The film released on 2 July 1999 with the tagline "Loving Heart". Keerthi Reddy, who became popular with Tholi Prema, failed to garner further recognition from this film and Ravoyi Chandamama and subsequently went to work in Hindi films.

Reception 
Griddhaluru Gopala Rao of Zamin Ryot gave the film a negative review. He noted that the first half is entertaining, but the film goes haywire in the second half. He praised the music, lyrics, picturisation in Jaipur but criticised the Telugu pronunciation of the singers, and certain plot points which he felt were unrealistic.

References

External links 

1999 films
1990s Telugu-language films
Films scored by S. A. Rajkumar
Indian romantic thriller films
Indian psychological thriller films
1990s romantic thriller films
1990s psychological thriller films
Central Bureau of Investigation in fiction
Films set in Jaipur
Films shot in Jaipur
Telugu remakes of Tamil films
1999 directorial debut films